The Electric Building is an 18-story Art Deco and Spanish Renaissance styled building located in downtown Fort Worth, Texas. The building currently houses apartments with the ground floor used for retail stores.

History
Construction on the building began in December 1927. Architect Wyatt C. Hedrick was chosen to design the building.  The building also housed the Texas Electric Service Company and the Hollywood Theater. In 1929 a six-story annex was constructed on an adjoining lot.

Interfirst Bank purchased the building in 1974.  After closing the Hollywood Theater in 1976, it was remodeled as a banking facility.

The building was purchased by Robert Bass in 1984. In 1994 Bass converted the building into an apartment complex.

In 2009 it was purchased by Atlas Properties, and in 2016 Tradewind Properties of Houston purchased the building from Atlas.

It was added to the National Register in 1995.

See also

National Register of Historic Places listings in Tarrant County, Texas

References

External links

Architecture in Fort Worth: Historic Electric Building

Skyscraper office buildings in Fort Worth, Texas
Commercial buildings on the National Register of Historic Places in Texas
Art Deco architecture in Texas
Commercial buildings completed in 1929
National Register of Historic Places in Fort Worth, Texas